The Air France Madame Open, known in its final installment as Air France Madame Biarritz Open, was a women's professional golf tournament on the Ladies European Tour that took place in France.

Winners

References

External links
Ladies European Tour

Former Ladies European Tour events
Defunct golf tournaments in France